Nat Ma Taung (Khaw-nu-soum or Khonuamthung in Chin), also known as Mount Victoria, is the highest mountain in the Chin State of western Burma.

Geography

Located in three townships - Kanpatlet, Mindat and Matupi, Nat Ma Taung is part of the Chin Hills range.

Ecology
Nat Ma Taung is in the Chin Hills–Arakan Yoma montane forests ecoregion. Surrounded at lower elevations by tropical and subtropical moist forests, Nat Ma Taung's higher elevations form a sky island, home to many temperate and alpine species typical of the Himalaya further north, and many endemic species. The White-browed nuthatch (Sitta victoriae) is a bird endemic to this mountain range.

The peak is unique for the presence of trees, bushes and grass, which have adapted to the environment. On the way towards the top you will pass pine trees (Pinus kesiya), common names are Khasi pine, Benguet pine or three-needled pine. The local name is ထင်းရှူး [tʰḭ́ jú]) which is one of the most widely distributed pines in Asia. as well as many oaks (Quercus spp.). Epiphytes still cover older trees despite illegal picking; so many Coelogyne, Dendrobium and Cymbidium plants can be seen. Rhododendron arboreum flowers along roads during the dry season.

Conservation

The mountain is now protected within Nat Ma Taung National Park, established in 1994. The park is administered by the Department of Forestry and Environment.

The base of this national park can be reached either via Kanpetlet Township (easy access), or via Mindat Township (not easy as the road is incomplete). The only public transport to the base of the mountain is a four-wheel drive jeep that plies between Soe and the mountain base via Kanpetlet in the dry season. The road up to the lodge after Kanpetlet town is sealed (= hard-surfaced) and beyond is an earth track. The track is not navigable even by a four-wheel drive in the wet season due to severe damage by storm water. The track is the main access to about 20 villages near the base of the mountain. At the base of the mountain, one track leads to villages, the centre track leads to the peak, and the other track traverses to Mindat Township and then on to Soe Township. Due to tract damage, tourists, many national and few international, visit the mountain mainly in the dry season. The tract is navigable by a four-wheel drive car all the way to the peak. Many motorcycles-for-hire offer rides to the top, and if you walk both up and down, you are the extreme tourist. To walk from "base camp parking lot" it usually takes three hours up and maybe two down.

The mountain is "protected" by words only. Many activities that hinder the natural beauty and its bio-diversity are taking place unabated. The park is virtually not managed, as there are no security personnel, park wardens and the like. One main threat that is affecting the bio-diversity of this national park is bush fires ignited by local people. Trees were seen burning even on top of the mountain in 2014 May. The second issue tarnishing the beauty of the mountain is accumulation of litter, paper, cartons, cans, plastic, polythene and cans. The visitors are not provided with any instructions on what not to do within the park. There is no admission fee. The number of visitors to the peak is unknown. Foreign visitors during the year are about 100 whereas large number of local people visit the peak almost daily in the dry season.

The people living in all villages are poor. Basic services such as education, health and water supply are extremely poor. There are opportunities that could provide potential employment to local people especially the youth through promotion of eco-tourism. The engagement of youth as tourist guides will also help protect this beautiful mountain by educating the public as well as making them to be vigilant over destructive activities that are taking place at present. The development of eco-tourism is also seen as a potential vehicle to develop remote villages hugged within the park.

Climate

The mountaintop has a borderline alpine climate (Köppen climate classification ET) along with Subtropical Highland climate (Köppen Cwc/Cwb) in the nearby surroundings terrain.

Gallery

See also
List of Ultras of Southeast Asia
List of mountains in Burma
List of Southeast Asian mountains

References

External links

Hike Mt Victoria in southern Chin state of Myanmar (Burma)

Geography of Chin State
Mountains of Myanmar